Greek Reporter is a news organization for Greek people around the world. It functions as a news agency and online portal consisting of a collection of internet news web sites for Greek people and people of Greek descent who live and work in and outside Greece.

History

It was founded in 2008 by Anastasios (Tasos) Papapostolou as Greek Hollywood Reporter, a news portal for the Greek community in the entertainment business. Two years later, the site expanded in order to target all Greek diaspora and changed its name to Greek Reporter.

References

External links
 

Greek news websites
Greek diaspora
English-language mass media in Greece